Alwyn van der Merwe (born November 1927 in South Africa) is an American theoretical physicist. He is Emeritus Professor of Physics in the Department of Physics and Astronomy, University of Denver.

Life and career 
As a young man, Alwyn van der Merwe graduated at the top of his class every year throughout his high school and university studies.

An aspiring physicist, he attended the University of Stellenbosch, completing both his bachelor's degree in 1947 and master's degree in 1949 with summa cum laude honors.

He received the Queen Victoria Scholarship in 1949 to begin his doctoral studies in physics at the University of Amsterdam. It is awarded each year to the best student in South Africa. He also received an academic gold medal from the South African government for his performance in the subject of history, an honor given out only once a year.

Van der Merwe studied theoretical physics at the University of Amsterdam under Professors Jan de Boer and S. A. Wouthuysen and received doctorates from the University of Amsterdam and, later, the University of Bern, where he graduated summa cum laude.

Fresh from Amsterdam, he taught applied mathematics at the University of Natal in Pietermaritzburg, South Africa, first as lecturer then as senior lecturer.

Continuing his postdoctoral work, Alwyn van der Merwe was a research associate of Professor of Physics and Natural Philosophy Henry Margenau at Yale University and Professor Hans Jensen, a 1963 Nobel Prize winner, at the University of Heidelberg.

His first appointment in the United States was at Carleton College, in Northfield, Minnesota, where he filled an assistant professorship for two years. This is where he met his Swedish wife, Inga, who was also a faculty member. Inga encouraged him to apply at Queens College, City University of New York (CUNY), which she had recently visited. His application was favorably received, and while waiting for his interview, he was offered the position of assistant professor, sight unseen. 
He stayed on for two years at CUNY until he was offered an associate professorship in 1964 (and a full professorship a few years later) at the University of Denver (DU). After moving to Colorado, he and Inga had two daughters, Anita and Britta. He taught for the remainder of his career at DU, where he conducted research in statistical thermodynamics, intermolecular forces, relativity and foundations of physics.

His early years at DU saw the creation of the journal Foundations of Physics in 1970 by Professor Henry Margenau and Philosophy of Science and Professor of History Wolfgang Yourgrau, with an editorial board of Nobel laureates and other leaders in their fields of expertise. Van der Merwe helped write the original statement of purpose and introduction of the journal.

Professors van der Merwe and Asım Barut were the first referees selecting papers for Foundations of Physics, which started as a quarterly journal. However, Yourgrau occasionally stepped in and accepted papers that van der Merwe and Barut believed were not up to the standards of the journal, leading to internal conflict and threats of lawsuits.

While his brother, Johannes (Jan) Hermanus, was on sabbatical leave in 1968 and staying in Denver with Alwyn, they completed two papers on the dispersion forces between axially symmetric molecules (see publications 6 and 7 in Curriculum Vitae). The papers were published in Foundations of Physics and the Journal of Mathematical Physics, thus bringing to completion the work that Alwyn started at Yale University under Henry Margenau (see publications 1, 2 and 3 and also included in Margenau's book). Sadly, Jan van der Merwe suffered a heart attack and tragically died at the age of 54, leaving his further works in nuclear physics unfinished for Professor Dr. Rikus Saayman and Alwyn to complete (see publication 12).

Van der Merwe and Yourgrau remained co-editors of Foundations of Physics until Yourgrau's death in 1979, when Professor van der Merwe took over as the sole editor of the journal. He continued editing the journal, which he turned into a monthly publication, for another 28 years.

Foundations of Physics was the most cited physics journal of the era and had the highest impact factor. So many papers were submitted that Professor van der Merwe started Foundations of Physics Letters in 1988 to accommodate more of the papers that came in. To be accepted for publication, he required each paper to have at least three positive recommendations by peer reviewers and at least five positive replies for controversial papers.

He was often discouraged to find that new ideas in physics were rejected by fellow physicists because they were protecting their own research. He received numerous threats for either publishing or not publishing papers. For this reason, his office number was not made public at the DU physics department nor his picture published.

In 1982, with the strong encouragement of his wife, Alwyn van der Merwe initiated the highly acclaimed book series Fundamental Theories of Physics. Under his sole editorship, more than 150 volumes were published, which included many influential volumes authored by leading scientists in their respective fields, such as those by noted Italian physicist Ettore Majorana.

In 2007, the German publishing company of Foundations of Physics and Foundations of Physics Letters removed Professor van der Merwe as editor. The publisher cited the new editor's Nobel Prize as the reason for taking Foundations of Physics away, but Alwyn always believed it was because of a series of controversial papers he had included in the journal.

Throughout his career, Alwyn van der Merwe also wrote and edited 23 books and translated a book of physicist Louis de Broglie from French into English.

During initial review of his first book, Treatise on Irreversible and Statistical Thermophysics: An Introduction to Nonclassical Thermodynamics, the publisher said that if it was written in the style of the chapter that van der Merwe had written, it would be accepted. He then took over writing the rest of the book, and it was eventually published.

He also published papers in other subjects beyond physics.

Although his teaching mainly focused on graduate-level courses across a spectrum of topics in advanced physics, he also taught undergraduate classes. Due to student demand for more practical classes during the Vietnam War, DU administrators asked him to teach an undergraduate health class.

Characteristically, he developed what became a very popular health class focused on the dangers of X-rays (emitted by medical equipment, microwave ovens, TVs, etc.), the harmful effects of smoking (especially on airplanes), pollutants and vitamins. He was particularly interested in vitamins because his Foundations of Physics editorial board included vitamin C discoverer, Albert Szent-Györgyi, and vitamin C proponent Linus Pauling, among many other Nobel Prize winners. He also taught Swedish at DU for one year.

Personal History
Alwyn was born on a farm close to Citrusdal, a small town in the Cape Province of the Republic of South Africa, in November 1927. Alwyn grew up without electricity so he always had to study by lantern.

Growing up, he showed an affinity for teaching by helping friends in school with their studies. For example, Alwyn helped his long-time friend Felix, who was not very good in German, to complete his requirement and graduate. Alwyn helped Felix by composing a detailed story in German that Felix memorized. That way, Felix had good answers ready for whatever questions were asked on the exam, such as describing a day at home or a trip to the farm.

Throughout his life, Alwyn was always trying to help out others in their careers. Multiple colleagues sought him out to co-author various books and papers.

The health and well-being of his family was always at the forefront of Alwyn's mind. When Inga was pregnant with their first child, their obstetrician ordered a chest X-ray. Baffled, Alwyn applied to his wife what he was teaching in his health class, namely avoiding radiation exposure, and he decided it was time to change doctors.

After a lot of research on doctors around the world, they found the perfect fit in their own backyard: Dr. Robert Bradley, who had written a popular book on natural childbirth entitled Husband-Coached Childbirth. The couple was attracted to Dr. Bradley because he avoided prescribing drugs and encouraged fathers to actively take part and care for the expectant mothers, including staying in the delivery room. In those days, that was usually not allowed, but Dr. Bradley had an agreement with Denver's Swedish and Porter hospitals.
Alwyn's daughters, Anita and Britta, were born with their father helping Inga in the delivery room through easy childbirths—with Dr. Bradley present at the last minute.

Alwyn also loved to connect with people across the world through his talent for letter writing.

For example, he exchanged many letters with Astrid Lindgren, the Swedish author of well-known children's books including Pippi Longstocking. Lindgren's books had been adapted for European television, and the shows were very popular when Alwyn's family saw them during an overseas trip. For years, U.S. television executives turned down the shows because, in their view, there wasn't enough action or violence. Alwyn attempted to help Lindgren get the TV adaptations of her books shown in the United States.

Alwyn also wrote letters to Swedish Prime Minister Olof Palme to protest the discrepancies in Swedish law between its treatment of fathers versus mothers in determining if a child could become a Swedish citizen. It was automatic if the father was Swedish, but not if the mother was Swedish.

In addition, he wrote numerous recommendation letters for his students, colleagues and friends who requested his help getting grants, work and awards. He even occasionally helped out strangers, such as a Northwestern Airlines employee who was particularly helpful. When he wrote a very complimentary letter, she was promoted. He never saw her again; however, many of her colleagues asked him to write them a recommendation letter, too.

Alwyn had a passion for travel, so for many years, he frequently took his family on overseas trips. He wanted his family to only travel first class for the long flights, so his wife would collect millions of frequent flyer miles to fund the trips. In those days it was easy to acquire miles through promotions on everyday products.

His lifelong love of learning and his international travel experiences led him to learn many languages. His mother tongue was Afrikaans, and he was fluent in English, German, Dutch and Swedish. He also understood French and Italian and was working on his Spanish.

He has acted extensively as editor in theoretical physics and the philosophy of science. In 1988 van der Merwe became the founding editor of the journal Foundations of Physics Letters, until its incorporation in 2007 into its sister journal Foundations of Physics, of which he succeeded Margenau as co-editor in 1975.

Education
B.Sc. University of Stellenbosch, R.S.A. (1947) (summa cum laude)
M.Sc. University of Stellenbosch, R.S.A. (1949) (summa cum laude)
Ph.D. University of Amsterdam (1954) and University of Bern (1971) (summa cum laude)

Professional Experience
1968 to present Professor of Physics , University of Denver
1964–1968 Associate Professor of Physics, University of Denver
1962–1964 Assistant Professor of Physics, Queens College of CUNY, New York
1960–1962 Assistant Professor of Physics , Carleton College , Northfield, Minnesota
1954–1960 Lecturer and Senior Lecturer in Applied Mathematics (Permanent Position), University of Natal, Pietermaritzburg, R.S.A.
Professional Memberships

    American Association for Physics Teachers
    American Association for University Professors
    British Society for the Philosophy of Science
    European Physical Society
    International Society on General Relativity and Gravitation
    Netherlands Physics Society
    Sigma Xi

Publications

    A. J. van der Merwe, "Dispersion Energies of Interaction between Asymmetric Molecules.  I. Dipole—Dipole Interactions, " Z. Physik 196, 212 (1966).
    A. J. van der Merwe, "Dispersion Energies of Interaction between Asymmetric Molecules. II. Dipole—Quadrupole Interactions," Z. Physik 196, 332 (1966).
    A. J. van der Merwe, "Quadrupole—Quadrupole and Dipole—Octupole Dispersion Forces Between Axially Symmetric Molecules," Z. Naturforschung 22a, 593 (1967)
    A. J. van der Merwe, "Entropy Balance in Photosynthesis, " Proc. Natl. Acad. Sci.. 59, 734 (1968).
    A. J. van der Merwe, "Did Ernst Mach 'Miss the Target?" Synthese 18, 234 (1968)
    J. H. van der Merwe and A.J. van der Merwe, " Second—Order Dispersion Energy Series for Axially Symmetric Molecules , Math. Phys. 10, 539 (1969).
      A. J. van der Merwe and J.H. van der Merwe, "Dispersion Interactions Between Unexcited Molecules Possessing Axial Symmetry: Arbitrary—Order Contributions, " Found. Phys. 3, 297—311 (1973).
     A. J. van der Merwe and J. H. van der Merwe, Interactions  Between  Molecules  Having Axial  "Dispersion  Symmetry : Contributions of Order Six and Eight," Found. Phys. 4, 65–74 (1976)
    L. S. Mayants and A. J. van der Merwe, "Some Methodological Problems in Quantum Physics, " Ann. Physik 33, 21 – 35 (1976).
    L. Janossy and A. J. van der Merwe, "On the  Dimensionality Of Physical Space, " Act-a. Physica (1978)
    L. Janossy and A. J. van der Merwe, "On the Mode of Propagation of Light, " Astronomische Machrichten 301, 1 (1980).
    J. H. van der Merwe, R. Saayman, and A. J. van der Merwe, "Linear Shell Model Relationships Between Negative—Parity States of Even Mass A = 30 – 40 Nuclei, " Z. Phys. A 311,225–241 (1983).
    A. J. van der Merwe, "Obituary: Wolfgang Yourgrau", Nature 284 , 289 (1980).
    A. J. van der Merwe, "Obituary: Wolfgang Yourgrau , "Physics Today, 69 (April 1980).
    A. J. van der Merwe, "Editorial Postscript to 'The Evolution of the Ideas of Louis de Broglie on the Interpretations of Wave Mechanics, " Found. Phys. 12, 955–962 (1992).
    A. O. Barut and A. J. van der Merwe, "To Eugene Paul Wigner on his Eightieth Birthday, Found. Phys. 13, 3 (1983).
    A. O. Barut and A. J. van der Merwe, "Paul Dirac on his Eightieth Birthday, " Found. Phys. 187 (1983)
    F. Jenc, W. Maas, O. Melsheimer, I-I. Neumann, and A. J. van der Merwe, "Gunther Ludwig and the Foundations of Physics, Found. Phys. 639 (1983)
    M. Carmeli and A. van der Merwe, "For Nathan Rosen on his Seventy—Fifth Birthday, " Found. Phys. JA, 923 (1984)
    G. Nicolis, L. Reichl, and A. van der Merwe, "Ilya Prigogine on his Seventieth Birthday, " Found. Phys. 17, 459 (1987)
    P. Busch and A. van der Merwe, "Peter Mittelstaedt: Philosopher – Physicist, " Found. Phys. 19, 789 (1989).

Published books and Contributions to books

    A. J. van der Merwe, Treatise on Irreversible and Statistical Thermophysics, Macmillian, New York (1966)
    A. J. van der Merwe , eds., Perspectives in M.I.T. Press, Cambridge, MA (1971).
    A. J. van der Merge, "Alfred Lande and the Development of Quantum Theory, " in Perspectives in Quantum Theo – M.I.T. Press, Cambridge, MA (1971), pp. ix — xxxvii.
    A. J. van der Merwe, "Entropy (Positive and Negative),
    Information, and Statistical Thermodynamics , in Cosmology_,_ Fusion and Other Matters , F. Reines , ed. , Colorado Associated Press, Boulder, CO (1972), pp. 241—271.
    A. J. van der Merwe, Perspectives Theory, Dover Publications, New York (1979) ; revised edition of an earlier book. A. J. van der Merwe, Treatise on Irreversible and Statistical Thermophysics , Dover Publications , New York (1982), revised edition of an earlier book.
    H. J. Treder, H. von Borzeskowski, and A.J. van der Merwe, Fundamental Principles General Relativity. Theories, Plenun, New York (1980)
    A. J. van der Merwe, Preface to General Relativity. and Matter: A Spinor Field theory from Fermis to Light—years, by Mendel Sachs, D. Reidel, Dordrecht (1982) .
     A. J. van der Merwe, ed., Old and New Questions Physics Philosophy and Theoretical Biology, Plenum, New York (1983).
    A. J. van der Merwe, "For the Record: Wolfgang Yourgrau (1908–1979), "in Old and New Questions in Physics, Cosmology, Philosophy and Theoretical Biology, A.J. van der Merwe, ed, Plenum, New York (1983), pp. 1—34.
    A. J. van der Merwe, translator, "On the True Ideas Underlying Wave Mechanics, " L. de Broglie, in Old and New Questions _in Physics, Cosmology, Philosophy. and Theoretical Biology,  A.J. van der Merwe, ed., Plenum, New York (1983).
    A. J. van der Merwe , translator , "Precision Mathematics and Approximation Mathematics in Physics, " R. Rompe and H. —J. Treder, in 0.1d and New questions Physics, Cosmology, Philosophy and Theoretical Biology, A. van der Merwe, ed., Plenum, New York (1983).
    A. O. Barut, A. van der Merwe, and J. -P. Vigier, eds., and Time—The Quest Continues , Cambridge University Press, Cambridge (1984).
    A. O. Barut and A. van der Merwe, eds. , Selected Scientific Papers of Alfred Lande, Reidel, Dordrecht (1988).
    Gino Tarozzi and Alwyn van der Merwe, eds. , The Nature of? Quantum Paradoxes, Reidel, Dordrecht (1988).
     Alwyn van der Merwe , Franco Selleri, and Gino Tarozzi , eds. , Microphysical Real i TV Formalism, Vol.1, Reidel, Dordrecht (1988).
    Alwyn van der Merwe, Franco Selleri , and Gino Tarozzi , eds. , Microphysical Reality. and Formalism Vol. 2, Reidel , Dordrecht (1988).
    W. Zurek, A. van der Merwe, and W. Miller, eds., Between Quantum and Cosmos, Princeton University Press, Princeton (June 1988).

Invited Papers and Colloquia

    "Higher Multiple Dispersion Forces Between Asymmetric Molecules", invited paper delivered at Annual Meeting of the South African institute for Physics, Pretoria (July 1967).
    "Van der Waals Forces in Linear Molecules" ,  – invited paper delivered at the University of Stellenbosch, R.S.A. (August 1967).
    Invited speaker at the Third International Meeting on Epistemology, Delphi, Greece(did not attend) (October 1987).

Selected publications
 (Dover reprint of 1966 original)
 as editor:

 (pbk reprint of 1988 original)
 (pbk reprint of 1994 original)
 (pbk reprint of 1997 original)
 (pbk reprint of 1985 original)
 (pbk reprint of 1988 reprint)
 (pbk reprint of 2003 original)

 (pbk reprint of 1988 original)

References

External links
 Department of Physics and Astronomy, University of Denver

1927 births
Living people
21st-century American physicists
Afrikaner people
South African people of Dutch descent
Theoretical physicists
South African emigrants to the United States
University of Denver faculty
University of Amsterdam alumni
University of Bern alumni